Events in the year 1871 in Belgium.

Incumbents
Monarch: Leopold II
Head of government: Jules d'Anethan (to 7 December); Barthélémy de Theux de Meylandt (from 7 December)

Events
January
 1 January – Belgium repeals import duty on salt.

February
 21 February – Regular railway services between France and Belgium resumed.

March
 21 March – Victor Hugo moves to Brussels.

June
 1 June – Victor Hugo expelled from Belgium for endangering the public peace after publishing a letter in L'Indépendance Belge of 26 May criticising the Belgian government's attitude to Communard refugees.

December
 7 December – Barthélémy de Theux de Meylandt replaces Jules d'Anethan as Prime Minister.

Publications
Serials
 Analectes pour servir à l'histoire ecclésiastique de la Belgique, vol. 8.
 Annales de l'Académie d'archéologie de Belgique, vol. 27.
 Annales du Cercle archéologique de Mons, vol. 10.
 Annuaire de la noblesse de Belgique, vol. 25.
 Archives médicales belges, second series, vol. 14.
 Le Bibliophile belge, vol. 6.
 Bulletin de l'Académie royale de médecine de Belgique, third series, vol. 5.
 Bulletin de la Commission royale d'Histoire, third series, vol. 12.
 Bulletins d'arboriculture, de floriculture et de culture potagère
 Revue de Belgique, vol. 3.
 Revue de la numismatique belge, fifth series, vol. 3.

Official publications
 Code des contributions directes, douanes et accises de la Belgique, en vigueur au 1er janvier 1871
 Moniteur belge: journal officiel
 Rapport triennal sur la situation de l'instruction primaire en Belgique
 Rapport triennal sur l'état de l'enseignement moyen en Belgique

Other
 Léon d'Andrimont, Des institutions et des associations ouvrières de la Belgique
 Émile de Borchgrave, Essai historique sur les colonies belges qui s'établirent en Hongrie et en Transylvanie pendant les XIe, XIIe et XIIIe siècles (Brussels)
 Jean-Baptist David, Manuel de l'histoire de Belgique
 Edouard Dupont, Les temps antéhistoriques en Belgique
 J.S.G. Nypels, Pasinomie. Collection complète des lois, décrets, arrêtés et régelements généraux qui peuvent être invoqués en Belgique
 Adolphe Quetelet, Histoire des sciences mathématiques et physiques chez les Belges
 Eugène Somerhausen, Code politique de la Belgique

Births
 10 January – Emiel van Heurck, folklorist (died 1931) 
 8 February – Médard Tytgat, illustrator (died 1948)
 14 May – Louis de Brouchoven de Bergeyck, politician (died 1938)
 26 May – Camille Huysmans, politician (died 1968)
 29 May – Pieter Franciscus Dierckx, painter (died 1950)
 8 June – Aloys Van de Vyvere, politician (died 1961) 
 12 June – Pierre-Célestin Lou, abbot (died 1949)
 9 July – Auguste-Léopold Huys, missionary (died 1938)
 11 July – Armand Huyghé, soldier (died 1944)
 23 July – Ovide Decroly, psychologist (died 1932)
 30 September – Adolphe Stoclet, art collector (died 1949)
 5 October – Karl Hanquet, historian (died 1928)
 30 November – Emile de Cartier de Marchienne, diplomat (died 1946)
 29 December – Emmanuel Foulon, Olympic archer (died 1945)

Deaths
 8 January – Henri Eugène Lucien Gaëtan Coemans (born 1825), priest and botanist
 18 January – Princess Joséphine Marie of Belgium (born 1870)
 2 February – Jan Frans Loos (born 1799), politician 
 10 February – Étienne Constantin de Gerlache (born 1785), first Prime Minister of Belgium
 26 March – François-Joseph Fétis (born 1784), musicologist
 18 May – Constance Trotti (born 1800), hostess and patron of the arts
 October – Théodore Fourmois (born 1814), artist

References

 
Belgium
Years of the 19th century in Belgium
1870s in Belgium
Belgium